is a national (state-run) high school in Kanazawa, Ishikawa, Japan.

History

School life 
School Festival
Kisaragi festival
Education practice
Club
School trip

Notable alumni 
Naoki Okada (a member of the Diet of Japan)

See also 
 Kanazawa University

External links 
School website (in English)
Kanazawa University

High schools in Ishikawa Prefecture
Educational institutions established in 1952
Schools in Ishikawa Prefecture
Kanazawa University
1952 establishments in Japan